Matonis is a Lithuanian language family name. It may refer to:
Robert Matonis, real name of Beatle Bob
Jon Matonis, former executive director of the Bitcoin Foundation
Edwinn C Matonis II, The myth, the man, the legend
 

 
Lithuanian-language surnames